Dheewanaa Hiyy is a Maldivian television series directed by Easa Shareef. Produced by EMA Productions, the series stars Yoosuf Shafeeu, Lufshan Shakeeb and Sheereen Abdul Wahid in lead roles. The series narrates the conflicts between two families due to the resurface of a brief love affair in the past.

Cast

Main
 Yoosuf Shafeeu as Amir
 Lufshan Shakeeb as Fahud
 Sheereen Abdul Wahid as Maiha
 Koyya Hassan Manik as Naseer
 Fauziyya Hassan as Asima
 Aminath Rasheedha as Shaira
 Hussain Shibau as Ahusan

Guest
 Ibrahim Wisan as family doctor (Episode 5)

Episodes

Soundtrack

References

Serial drama television series
Maldivian television shows